Orellana may refer to:

Places
 Orellana de la Sierra
 Orellana Province
 Orellana la Vieja
 Orellana, Peru

People
Dori Parra de Orellana (1923-2007), Venezuelan politician
Fabián Orellana (born 1986), Chilean footballer
Francisco de Orellana (1511–1546), Spanish explorer
Ignatius de Orellana (1860–1931), British violinist and conductor
Nicolás Orellana (born 1995), Chilean footballer
Rosa Orellana, American mathematician

Other
Orellana (cicada), a genus of cicadas in the tribe Zammarini